The West Division is one of four divisions in the North American Hockey League.  The division currently has six teams and was formed in 2008 when the Wenatchee Wild became the fourth team required for a division. Prior to the 2010 expansion, only four teams operated in the West. The current champion of this division is the Wenatchee Wild.

Division membership

Current members
Alaska Avalanche - Joined in 1996; formerly of the South Division (as the St Louis Sting/ Springfield Spirit/ Wasilla Spirit)
Dawson Creek Rage - Joined in 2010 as an expansion team
Fairbanks Ice Dogs - Joined in 2001; formerly of the North Division 
Fresno Monsters - Joined in 2010 as an expansion team
Kenai River Brown Bears - Joined in 2007; formerly of the South Division 
Wenatchee Wild - Joined in 2008 as an expansion team

Former members
Billings Bulls - Founding member; moved to the Northern Pacific Hockey League in 2006
Bismarck Bobcats - Founding member; moved to the Central Division in 2005
Bozeman Icedogs - Founding member; moved to the Northern Pacific Hockey League in 2006
Fargo-Moorhead Jets - Founding member; folded in 2007
Helena Bighorns - Founding member; moved to the Northern Pacific Hockey League in 2006
Minnesota Blizzard - Founding member; moved to the Central Division in 2005

The Division Members

West Division Champions - listed by year